George Gregory may refer to:

George Gregory Jr. (1921–2003), South Carolina Justice
George Gregory (1670–1746), English MP for Nottingham
George Gregory (basketball) (1906–1994), basketball player for Columbia University
George C. Gregory (1878–1956), American attorney, businessman, historian, and author
George Burrow Gregory (1813–1893), British MP for East Grinstead
George Frederick Thompson Gregory (1916–1973), Canadian politician representing Victoria City
George Gregory (British writer) (1754–1808), British writer, scholar and cleric
George W. Gregory (1879–1946), University of Michigan football player
George Gregory (cricketer) (1878–1958), English cricketer
George Gregory (physician) (1790–1853), English physician
George S. Gregory (1846–?), Warden of the Borough of Norwalk, Connecticut, 1887–1888
George Gregory (footballer) (1873–?), English professional footballer
George W. Gregory Jr. (born 1938), member of the South Carolina House of Representatives